The Vanderbilt Commodores football program represents Vanderbilt University in the sport of American football. The Commodores compete in the Football Bowl Subdivision (FBS) of the National Collegiate Athletic Association (NCAA) and the East Division of the Southeastern Conference (SEC). They are led by head coach Clark Lea. Vanderbilt plays their home games at FirstBank Stadium, located on the university's Nashville, Tennessee campus.

History

Vanderbilt has a winning percentage of .492, the second lowest among all members in the Southeastern Conference.

Head coaches

Adopting the nickname the Commodores after the 1897 season, the team has played in 1,250 games over 126 seasons. In that time, six coaches have led the Commodores to a postseason bowl appearance: Art Guepe, Steve Sloan, George MacIntyre, Bobby Johnson, James Franklin and Derek Mason. Four have led them to a conference championship: R. G. Acton, W. H. Watkins, James R. Henry, and Dan McGugin. McGugin is the leader in seasons coached and games won, with 198 victories during his 30 years at Vanderbilt. He was awarded two National Championships retroactively by Clyde Berryman.

Of the 29 different head coaches who have led the Commodores, McGugin, Ray Morrison, Red Sanders, and Bill Edwards have been inducted into the College Football Hall of Fame.

The head coach is Clark Lea, who was hired on December 14, 2020.

Conference affiliations
Vanderbilt has been affiliated with the following conferences.
 Independent (1890–1894)
 SIAA (1895–1921)
 Southern Conference (1922–1932)
 Southeastern Conference (1933–present)

Championships

Conference championships
Vanderbilt has won 14 conference championships, with six shared and eight won outright.

† Co-champions

National championships 
Vanderbilt has been awarded 6 national championships for the years 1906, 1910, 1911, 1918, 1921, and 1922.  The selectors were determined for 1918 by David Wilson; 1910, 1921, and 1922 by James Howell; 1906 and 1911 by Richard Billingsley Report; 1921 and 1922 by Clyde P. Berryman QPRS.

Undefeated seasons 
Vanderbilt has had 8 undefeated seasons in the years 1890, 1897, 1904, 1910, 1921, 1922, 1943, and 1944.

Bowl games 
Vanderbilt has been invited to nine bowl games, with the Commodores garnering a record of 4–4–1 in bowl games.

Rivals

Tennessee

Vanderbilt and Tennessee have played 112 times since 1892
, Tennessee leads the series 75–32-5. When the rivalry first started Vanderbilt dominated by taking 19 of the first 24 with 3 ties. From 1928 to 2011, Tennessee went 71–9–2 against Vanderbilt. But since 2012, Vanderbilt has won five of the last nine. The largest margin of victory for Vanderbilt was by 76 points in 1918 at Old Dudley Field in Nashville. (Vanderbilt 76, Tennessee 0) The largest defeat was 65 points in 1994 at Vanderbilt Stadium (Tennessee 65, Vanderbilt 0). The longest win streaks for Vanderbilt is (9) from 1901 to 1913. The longest win streak for Tennessee is 22, from 1983 to 2004.

Georgia

Having started in 1893, the Georgia-Vanderbilt football series has been played annually since 1968. The two are divisional opponents in the SEC East. The series, which rotates between Nashville, Tennessee, and Athens, Georgia, stands with Georgia leading 60-20–2 through the 2022 season.

Ole Miss

Ole Miss is Vanderbilt's cross-divisional rival in the SEC.

Vanderbilt and Ole Miss have played 92 times since 1894. Ole Miss leads the series 51-39-2. The largest margin of victory was by 91 points won by Vanderbilt in 1915. Vanderbilt also holds the longest win streaks in the series (18) from 1894 to 1938.

Kentucky

Having started in 1896, the Kentucky-Vanderbilt football series has been played annually since 1953. The two are divisional opponents in the SEC East. The series, which rotates between Nashville, Tennessee and Lexington, Kentucky, is led by Kentucky at 48-42–4 with the average score being Vanderbilt 16.9-Kentucky 15.6.

Georgia Tech

The Commodores first met the Georgia Tech Yellow Jackets in 1892 in Atlanta, Georgia with Vanderbilt winning 20–10. Since 1924, the winning team in the series has received a silver-plated cowbell with the year and final score of each game engraved on it. The trophy was created by Ed F. Cavaleri, who was described by the Atlanta Constitution as “a faithful Georgia Tech supporter though he did not attend the Jacket institution,” according to Georgia Tech's website. Cavaleri purchased a cowbell at an Atlanta hardware store to use as a noise-maker while on his way to a game in 1924. The Commodores defeated Georgia Tech 3–0, however another fan in attendance suggested that Cavaleri award the bell to the winning team. The tradition was born and Cavaleri attended every game between the two teams from 1924 to 1967. The cowbell has a gold plate screwed into each side, with “GEORGIA TECH-VANDERBILT FOOTBALL TROPHY” inscribed at the top. Three columns list the year of each game, Vanderbilt’s points scored and Georgia Tech’s points scored. The results of the games from 1924 to 1967 are engraved on one side; the results from 2002, 2003, 2009 and 2016 are on the other. Vanderbilt is 15–20-3 against Georgia Tech in 38 games. The Commodores lost the last matchup 38–7 in 2016.

Sewanee

Vanderbilt and the Sewanee Tigers were both founding members of the Southern Intercollegiate Athletic Association (SIAA), the Southern Conference, and the Southeastern Conference (SEC). It is the oldest of Vanderbilt's rivalries; dating back to 1891 when Vanderbilt played its second football game. Vanderbilt leads the series 40–8–4. The largest margin of victory was in 1905 when Vanderbilt won 68–4. Usually played towards the end of the season on Thanksgiving Day, the two teams have not met again since 1944 and are unlikely to anytime soon as Sewanee plays in NCAA Division III.

Uniforms

Traditionally, Vanderbilt has featured differing designs of gold helmets, black jerseys, and gold or black pants at home, and gold helmets, white jerseys and gold, or white pants on the road. Meanwhile, the traditional alternate uniform saw gold helmets and jerseys matched with white pants.

The James Franklin (2011–2013), and Derek Mason (2014-2020) eras saw the introduction of several new combinations- including "blackout” (i.e. all black), and "whiteout" (i.e. all white) uniforms. The team's gold alternate jerseys were also re-designed with the addition of black shoulders and a more muted gold. Eventually, battleship gray was incorporated as well.

The Clark Lea (2021–Present) era has seen a return to traditional gold helmets (note: featuring a modernized “V” logo), black jerseys, and gold pants at home, and gold helmets, white jerseys, and gold (or white) pants on the road. Vanderbilt introduced a new all white ("whiteout") uniform at the start of the 2022 season.

Individual awards

College Football Hall of Fame
Vanderbilt Commodore football personnel have been inducted into the National Football Foundation's National College Football Hall of Fame.

Players

Coaches

All-Americans

Consensus All-American
Vanderilt has had seven consensus All-Americans in their history. In 2016, Zach Cunningham became the first unanimous All-American in Vanderbilt's history.

All-Southerns

Conference recognition
Vanderbilt Commodores personnel, including coaches and players, have received recognition from the Southeastern Conference for their performances on the football field.

Most Valuable Player 
Five Vanderbilt players have been awarded Most Valuable Player, with three of them being awarded over a six year span to Commodores.

Offensive Player of the Year
One Vanderbilt player has won Offensive Player of the Year honors.

Freshman of the Year
Two players have won Freshman of the Year while at Vanderbilt.

Best Blocker
One Commodore has won Best Blocker, doing so twice.

Best Wide Receiver

Coach of the Year
Five Vanderbilt coaches have won Coach of the Year honors over the past century.

Future opponents 
Announced schedules as of April 26, 2020
''No games are scheduled for the 2030 and 2031 seasons.

References

Further reading

External links

 

 
American football teams established in 1890
1890 establishments in Tennessee